The African Para Games is a multi-sport event contested by para-athletes from African nations.

Editions
The first edition of the African Para Games was announced by International Paralympic Committee Andrew Parsons in January 2022 during a visit to Ghana, the host country of the 2023 African Games.

Sports
The sports contested at the African Para Games are; Para Athletics, Para powerlifting, Para Taekwondo, Wheelchair Tennis, Wheelchair Basketball, Goalball, Sitting Volleyball, and Blind football.

See also
African Paralympic Committee
African Games
Paralympic Games
Asian Para Games
European Para Championships
Parapan American Games

References

External links

 
Disabled multi-sport events
Multi-sport events in Africa
Multi-sport events